The women's K-2 500 metres event was a pairs kayaking event conducted as part of the Canoeing at the 1980 Summer Olympics program.

Medalists

Results

Heats
Thirteen crews entered in two heats on July 30, but one withdrew. The top three finishers from each of the heats advanced directly to the final while the remaining six teams were relegated to the semifinal.

In the official report, Mincheya's first name was listed as Velichka.

Semifinal
The top three finishers in the semifinal (raced on August 1) advanced to the final.

Final
The final was held on August 1.

The East Germans achieved the most decisive victory in women's Olympic canoeing ever.

References
1980 Summer Olympics official report Volume 3. p. 197. 
Sports-reference.com 1980 women's K-2 500 m results.
Wallechinsky, David and Jaime Loucky (2008). "Canoeing: Women's Kayak Pairs 500 Meters". In The Complete Book of the Olympics: 2008 Edition. London: Aurum Press Limited. p. 493.

Women's K-2 500
Olympic
Women's events at the 1980 Summer Olympics